The  Edmonton Eskimos finished 4th in the West Division with a 7–11 record and failed to make the playoffs. This marked the end of their 34 year streak of making the playoffs, the longest such streak in North American sports history.

Offseason

CFL Draft

Transactions

*Portion of the trade was reversed due to Atogwe's long-term injury

Preseason

Schedule

Regular season

Season standings

Season schedule

Total attendance: 340,830
Average attendance: 37,870 (63.0%)

Awards and records

All-Star selections

References

Edmonton Eskimos
Edmonton Elks seasons